Prince Napoléon Joseph Charles Paul Bonaparte (9 September 1822 – 17 March 1891), usually called Napoléon-Jérôme Bonaparte or Jérôme Bonaparte, was the second son of Jérôme, King of Westphalia, youngest brother of Napoleon I, and his second wife Catharina of Württemberg. An outspoken liberal, he became the de facto head of the House of Bonaparte from 1879 to his death. He was not considered a legitimate pretender to the throne by many Bonapartists, due to his father's previous marriage without divorce.  They instead preferred his son Victor. From the 1880s he was one of the stronger supporters of General Georges Boulanger, together with other monarchist forces.

As well as bearing the title of Prince Napoléon, given to him by his cousin Emperor Napoleon III in 1852,
he was also 2nd Prince of Montfort, 1st Count of Meudon and Count of Moncalieri, following his marriage with Maria Clotilde of Savoy in 1859. His popular nickname, Plon-Plon, stemmed from his difficulty in pronouncing his own name while still a child, although other notable historians and contemporary letters by his nephew Colonel Jérôme Bonaparte claim it was because he ran in cowardice during battle when the bombs fell. Another nickname, "Craint-Plomb" ("Afraid-of-Lead",) was given to him by the army due to his absence from the Battle of Solferino.

Biography 
Born at Trieste in the Austrian Empire (today Italy), and known as "Prince Napoléon", "Prince Napoléon-Jérôme, or by the sobriquet of "Plon-Plon", he was a close advisor to his first cousin, Napoleon III of France, and in particular was seen as a leading advocate of French intervention in Italy on behalf of Camillo di Cavour and the Italian nationalists. Until Napoleon III produced an heir apparent, the Bonaparte family were at odds for who should be the heir presumptive, a matter complicated by Jérôme Bonaparte's first marriage to American Elizabeth Patterson Bonaparte, with whom he had a son, Jérôme Napoléon Bonaparte. A meeting of the Bonaparte family, presided over by Napoleon III, determined that while Jérôme Napoléon Bonaparte was not considered illegitimate, he would be excluded from the line of succession, making Prince Napoléon the heir presumptive.

An anti-clerical liberal, he led that faction at court and tried to influence the Emperor to anti-clerical policies, against the contrary influence of the Emperor's wife, the Empress Eugénie, a devout Catholic and a conservative, and the patroness of those who wanted French troops to protect the Pope's sovereignty in Rome.  The Emperor was to navigate between the two influences throughout his reign.

When his cousin became president in 1848, Napoléon-Jérôme was appointed Minister Plenipotentiary to Spain. He later served in a military capacity as general of a division in the Crimean War, as Governor of Algeria, and as a corps commander in the French Army of Italy in 1859.

As part of his cousin's policy of alliance with Piedmont-Sardinia, in 1859 Napoléon-Jérôme married Princess Maria Clotilde of Savoy, daughter of Victor Emmanuel II of Italy. However this did not prevent a nine-year relationship with the courtesan Cora Pearl.

When Louis-Napoléon, Prince Imperial died in 1879, Prince Napoléon-Jérôme became, genealogically, the most senior member of the Bonaparte family, but the Prince Imperial's will excluded him from the succession, nominating Prince Napoléon-Jérôme's son Victor as the new head of the family. As a result, Prince Napoléon-Jérôme and his son quarreled for the remainder of Prince Napoléon-Jérôme's life.

Prince Napoléon-Jérôme, upon being banished from France by the 1886 law exiling heads of the nation's former ruling dynasties, settled at Prangins on the shores of Lake Geneva, in Vaud, Switzerland where, during the Second Empire, he had acquired a piece of property. The assets he left his heir were extremely modest: Besides the Villa Prangins and the adjoining estate of 75 hectares, estimated at 800,000 francs of the time, approximately 130 million of France's old francs, they were limited to a portfolio valued at 1,000,000 (1891) francs, about 160 million old francs.

Prince Napoléon-Jérôme died in Rome in 1891, aged 68.

Issue
He and Princess Maria Clotilde had three children:

Honours 
  French Empire: Grand Cross of the Legion of Honour, 3 January 1853
 : Grand Cordon of the Order of Leopold, 1 January 1854
 : Honorary Grand Cross of the Bath (military), 5 September 1855
   Sweden-Norway:
 Grand Cross of St. Olav, 3 September 1856
 Knight of the Seraphim, 12 September 1856
 : Knight of the Elephant, 24 September 1856

References in popular fiction 
Prince Napoléon-Jérôme takes a leading role in Robert Goddard's  novel Painting the Darkness.  References are made to his role in the Crimean War and his son's succession to the Bonapartist claim over him.
Prince Napoléon-Jérôme is a minor character in Donald Serrell Thomas's Sherlock Holmes novel Death on a Pale Horse (2013); Holmes and Dr. Watson are tasked with escorting him on a state visit to England as a possible claimant to the French throne after the death of his relative Napoléon, Prince Imperial in 1879.

Ancestry

References

In the Courts of Memory, by Lillie de Hegermann-Lindencrone, relates the story of the origin of his nickname, with the warning; Se non è vero è ben trovato.

Further reading

 Battesti, Michèle (2010) Plon-Plon: le Bonaparte Rouge.

Berthet-Leleux, François (1932) Le vrai prince Napoléon--Jérôme
Flammarion, Gaston (1939) Un neveu de Napoléon Ier, le prince Napoléon (Jérôme) 1822-1891
Edgar Holt, Plon-Plon: The Life of Prince Napoleon (London: Michael Joseph, 1973).

External links

1822 births
1891 deaths
Corsican politicians
Nobility from Trieste
Napoleon
Napoleon Joseph Charles Paul Bonaparte
French military personnel of the Crimean War
Napoleon Joseph Charles Paul Bonaparte
Burials at the Basilica of Superga
Honorary Knights Grand Cross of the Order of the Bath
People of the Second Italian War of Independence
Sons of kings
Anti-clericals